Chi Tauri, Latinised from χ Tauri, is a star system in the constellation of Taurus. The primary component has an apparent magnitude of about 5.4, meaning it is visible with the naked eye.

The main component of the system is Chi Tauri A. It is a B-type main-sequence star. It may be a binary star itself, as suggested from astrometric data from Hipparcos, although no orbit could be derived.

The secondary component of the system is Chi Tauri B, separated about 19″ from Chi Tauri A. It was thought to be a post-T Tauri star from its unusual spectrum, but later studies ruled this out. It is a double-lined spectroscopic binary—the two stars are not resolved but their spectra have periodic Doppler shifts indicating orbital motion. The two stars are an F-type star and a G-type star, respectively, and are designated Ba and Bb.

The radial velocity of Chi Tauri B has a slow drift indicating the presence of another star in the system. Designated Chi Tauri Bc, this massive object is too dim to be detected, but it appears in Chi Tauri B's spectrum as an infrared excess. Because of this infrared excess, this unseen component is thought to be a pair of K-type main-sequence stars both with masses 70% of the Sun's. The stars within the system appear to be dynamically interacting.

Naming
With φ, κ1, κ2 and υ, it composed the Arabic were the Arabs' Al Kalbain, the Two Dogs. According to the catalogue of stars in the Technical Memorandum 33-507 - A Reduced Star Catalog Containing 537 Named Stars, Al Kalbain were the title for five stars: φ as Alkalbain I, this star (χ) as Alkalbain II, κ1 as Alkalbain III, κ2 as Alkalbain IV and υ as Alkalbain V.

References

B-type main-sequence stars
F-type main-sequence stars
Spectroscopic binaries
5

Taurus (constellation)
Tauri, Chi
Durchmusterung objects
Tauri, 059
027638
020430
1369